Emine Muslı Kadın ("benign, trustworthy" and "consoler, comforter";  1699 – 2 August 1750) was a consort of Ottoman Sultan Ahmed III (reign 17031730).

Early life
Emine Muslı Kadın was born in 1699 in Sochi, Russia. She had two elder sisters and a younger brother. In her youth, she practiced playing piano and harp.

When she was eleven she was taken to Istanbul and was entrusted in the care of Saliha Sultan (a consort of Mustafa II, Ahmed III's older brother) in the Old Palace. Ahmed visited old palace in 1713 because of Eid-ul-Fitr and he came to the old palace to meet his nieces. Where he saw Musli then fourteen years old. She became the consort of Ahmed in 1714.

Palace life and charities
Musli Kadin enjoyed a comfortable status during the reign of Ahmed III. She had beautiful eyes with darting eyelashes. In 1715, she constructed a bakery in the bazaar of Istanbul. On 10 October 1715, she gave birth to her first child a daughter named Ayşe Sultan, in the Topkapi Palace. She was married thrice to grand vizier. During Ayşe second marriage she played a vital part in the politics. On 28 March 1728 she gave birth to her second and last child a daughter named Zübeyde Sultan. 

Musli Kadin commissioned bakeries, libraries and fountains in different places of Ottoman Empire. In 1742, she opened a rest house for travellers. She had number of wealth and she donated her wealth to needy people. She was a soft-hearted lady with forgiving nature.

Death
Emine Muslı Kadın was sent to the Old Palace in 1730 after the deposition of Ahmed. She was struck by plague in 1750. She died on 2 August 1750 and was buried in New Mosque at Eminönü in Istanbul.

Issue
By Ahmed III she had two daughters:
 Ayşe Sultan (10 October 1715 - 9 July 1775). Nicknamed Küçük Ayşe (meaning Ayşe the younger) to distinguish her from her cousin Ayşe the elder, daughter of Mustafa II. She married three times and had a daughter.
 Zübeyde Sultan (28 March 1728 - 4 June 1756). She married twice but had no child.

References

Sources
 
 
 

 
1699 births
1750 deaths
18th-century Ottoman royalty